Magnesium diglutamate is a compound with formula Mg(C5H8NO4)2. It is a magnesium acid salt of glutamic acid.

It has the E number E625 and is used in foods as a flavor enhancer.

References

Glutamates
Magnesium compounds
E-number additives